was a  after Kōwa and before Kajō. This period spanned the years from February 1104 through April 1106.

Change of era
 January 30, 1104 : The new era name was created to mark an event or series of events. The previous era ended and the new one commenced in Kōwa 6, on the 10th day of the 2nd month.

Events of the Chōji era
 1104 (Chōji 1, 3rd month): The emperor visited Sonshō-ji in northeastern Kyoto.
 1105 (Chōji 2, 6th month): A red snow was reported as having fallen in a number of Japanese provinces.

Notes

References
 Brown, Delmer M. and Ichirō Ishida, eds. (1979).  Gukanshō: The Future and the Past. Berkeley: University of California Press. ;  OCLC 251325323
 Nussbaum, Louis-Frédéric and Käthe Roth. (2005).  Japan encyclopedia. Cambridge: Harvard University Press. ;  OCLC 58053128
 Titsingh, Isaac. (1834). Nihon Ōdai Ichiran; ou,  Annales des empereurs du Japon.  Paris: Royal Asiatic Society, Oriental Translation Fund of Great Britain and Ireland. OCLC 5850691
 Varley, H. Paul. (1980). A Chronicle of Gods and Sovereigns: Jinnō Shōtōki of Kitabatake Chikafusa. New York: Columbia University Press. ;  OCLC 6042764

External links 
 National Diet Library, "The Japanese Calendar" -- historical overview plus illustrative images from library's collection

Japanese eras
12th century in Japan